Angela Asare (born 24 October 1985 in Accra) is a Ghanaian beauty queen and a contestant for Miss Universe.

Education
Angela Asare studied marketing at Montgomery College.

Beauty pageants
Angela Asare was the Ghanaian national ambassador for AIDS awareness. In 2006 she won the Miss Universe Ghana beauty contest. She later represented Ghana at Miss Universe 2006, which took place 23 July 2006 in Los Angeles. Asare, while failing to qualify in the pink of the 15 finalists finals, still managed to get the title of Miss Congeniality. At the time of the election, she was a student of Business Marketing. In 2007 she was the face of RUNWAY AFRICA, the first African fashion show in the United States. She appeared on the cover of MIMI Magazine for the 2007 summer edition.

External links 
 Article about Angel Asare at Feels Good 2 B Home

References 

Ghanaian beauty pageant winners
Living people
Miss Universe 2006 contestants
1985 births
Montgomery College alumni
Miss Universe Ghana winners